Frances Goodall CBE (8 December 1893 – 22 July 1976) was a British nurse who was General Secretary of the Royal College of Nursing and a founder of what became the Colostomy Association.

Personal life and career
Goodall was born in Dulwich in 1893 into a well off household. She was educated at home with her two brothers. Her family were in the medical profession and seeing her uncle at work made her decide to be a nurse. She spent two years teaching at Camden High School for Girls but then joined Guy's Hospital as a trainee nurse where her three uncles had also trained. She served in several roles as a sister before specialising in the treatment of eyes.

In 1928 she became the assistant General Secretary of the College of Nursing which was established with a Royal Charter that year.

In 1935 Goodall became College of Nursing's General Secretary when the Trades Union Congress promoted a Bill to secure a 48-hour working week for all hospital employees. The college opposed this and was accused by the TUC of being "an organisation of voluntary snobs". She was given an OBE in 1944. In 1948 the National Health Service was created and she sat on the Joint industrial council which was the formal meeting of the nurses with their new employees. Her organisation got on well with Aneurin Bevan and welcomed the NHS at a time when the doctor's organisation was not in favour of the change.

In 1953 she was awarded a CBE and she retired in 1957 and she was succeeded by Catherine Mary Hall.

In 1967 she was a founder of the Colostomy Welfare Group with Gertrude Swithenbank. This would become the Colostomy Association.

Goodall died in the Royal Free Hospital in 1976.

References

1893 births
1976 deaths
People from Dulwich
British women nurses
Nurses from London
20th-century British women